U (У у; italics: У у) is a letter of the Cyrillic script. The forms of the Cyrillic letter U are similar to the lowercase of the Latin letter Y (Y y; Y y).

History 
Historically, Cyrillic U evolved as a specifically East Slavic short form of the digraph  used in ancient Slavic texts to represent . The digraph was itself a direct loan from the Greek alphabet, where the combination  (omicron-upsilon) was also used to represent . Later, the o was removed, leaving the modern upsilon-only form.

Consequently, the form of the letter is derived from Greek upsilon , which was parallelly also taken over into the Cyrillic alphabet in another form, as Izhitsa . (The letter Izhitsa was removed from the Russian alphabet in the orthography reform of 1917/19.)

It is normally romanised as "u", but in Kazakh, it is romanised as "w".

In the Cyrillic numeral system, the Cyrillic letter U had a value of 400.

In other languages
In Tuvan the Cyrillic letter can be written as a double vowel.

Related letters and other similar characters

Υ υ : Greek letter Upsilon
U u : Latin letter U
Y y : Latin letter Y
Ў ў : Cyrillic letter Short U, used in Belarusian, Dungan, Siberian Eskimo (Yuit), Uzbek
Ӯ ӯ : Cyrillic letter U with macron, used in Tajik and Carpatho-Rusyn
Ӱ ӱ : Cyrillic letter U with diaeresis, used in Altai (Oyrot), Khakas, Gagauz, Khanty, Mari
Ӳ ӳ : Cyrillic letter U with double acute, used in Chuvash
Ү ү : Cyrillic letter straight U, used in Mongolian, Kazakh, Tatar, Bashkir, Dungan and other languages
Ұ ұ : Cyrillic letter Straight U with stroke, used in Kazakh
Ꭹ Ꮍ : The syllables gi and mu of the Cherokee syllabary; Ꭹ (gi) notably appearing in the Cherokee self-designation ᏣᎳᎩ (Tsalagi)
ע: The Hebrew letter Ayin
У̊: Cyrillic letter U with ring,used in shugnhi orthography.

Computing codes

References

External links

Vowel letters